Seri Iskandar (Jawi: سري إسكندر) is a town and capital of Perak Tengah District in Perak, Malaysia. It is located at about 40 km southwest of Ipoh on the main Ipoh-Lumut highway. A branch campus of Universiti Teknologi MARA and Kolej Profesional MARA are located in Seri Iskandar.

History 
The town was named after Paduka Seri Sultan Iskandar Shah, who ruled the state of Perak from 1918 until 1938. Several institutions started the township in the mid-eighties before it got its name. The Engineering Branch Campus of Universiti Sains Malaysia started its operation on a disused tin mine at about 5 km south of Tronoh in 1986. A religious secondary school, SMKA Sultan Azlan Shah, occupied a newly built school buildings at about 7 km east of Bota Kanan in 1987. A radio transmission station and a teachers living quarters were built soon after within this area. In 1988, the state government came out with a plan of a township with its own name. A large industrial park, a university with commercial parks and housing estates with an airport were parts of the plan of the township. However, progress was slow and the investors were slow to come in. The eastern part of Seri Iskandar was an extension of Tronoh Mines prior to the 1980s. In the early 1990s, USM Engineering Campus was surrounded by disused mining pools. Except for a school, palm oil plantations covered the western part at this time. To travel from Tronoh to Bota, one must go through Seputih and Parit, to reach Bota.

It was not until the construction of a highway between Ipoh and Lumut that connected Tronoh to Bota directly, that further development took off. Universiti Teknologi Petronas (UTP) started its operation in the USM Campus buildings in 1996. USM Engineering Branch was to move to a new campus in Penang and the move was completed by 2001. PETRONAS acquired lands adjacent to the USM campus to build a new campus for UTP. The new campus was completely built by 2003. The Universiti Teknologi MARA (Perak Campus) also moved from Seri Manjung to Seri Iskandar by 2001. The numbers of food stalls and restaurants surged due to the sudden increase of population especially from the two new universities and the supporting industries. Residential areas were established starting with Taman Maju (1994), RPA Changkat Sodang (1995), JKR & Teachers' Quarters (1996), Bandar Universiti (2001), Desa Seri Iskandar (2002), Bandar Seri Iskandar (2003), Taman Gemilang (2008) and Puncak Iskandar (2012). A number of public facilities were also established in Seri Iskandar starting with a primary school (1993), followed by the district office (1996), a vocational school (1996), a secondary school (1998), a health office (1999),a petrol station (2003) and a mosque (2006). Two institutions of higher learning, Institut Kemahiran Belia Negara (IKBN) and Kolej Profesional MARA started operations in 2002 and 2005 respectively to build the reputation of Seri Iskandar as a 'Bandar Ilmu' (The Town of Knowledge).

Layout 

Seri Iskandar is a combination of satellite towns, most of them with several rows of shophouses and residential housing areas. The satellite towns are:
 Bandar Seri Iskandar (commonly referred to as SIDeC, the property developer)
 Bandar Universiti
 Bandar Baru Seri Iskandar
 Taman Maju
 Desa Seri Iskandar (includes RPA Changkat Sodang)
Lestari IUS

Seri Iskandar is located halfway between the state capital, Ipoh city and Lumut.

Seri Iskandar is 10 km from Bota, 10 km from Tronoh, 17 km from Parit, 40 km from Ipoh and 40 km from Sitiawan.

Perak Tengah District
Towns in Perak